Tamzin Malleson (born 1 May 1974) is an English actress.

Career
She originally played Alison Dangerfield in Series 3 and 4 of the BBC drama Dangerfield, before going on to play one of the starring roles (Penny Neville) in the Channel 4 comedy Teachers for three of the programme's four series, and she starred in one of ITV's Poirot adaptations, "Evil Under The Sun." She has appeared in The Bill, and in the detective show A Touch of Frost, and starred in the BBC medical drama Bodies.

Malleson played the role of Kate Wilding, the pathologist in the series Midsomer Murders, from the middle of series 14 to the end of series 17.

Personal life
Malleson is in a relationship with actor Keith Allen (who starred alongside her in Bodies), and the couple have a daughter, Teddie Malleson-Allen (born in April, 2006). They live near Stroud, Gloucestershire. In 2017, Allen and Malleson opened a diner in Stroud, built with the diner set of ‘’Kingsman: The Golden Circle’’ in which Allen had appeared.

Filmography

References

External links

1974 births
Living people
20th-century English actresses
21st-century English actresses
Actresses from Manchester
Actresses from Somerset
People from Yeovil
Alumni of the Royal Central School of Speech and Drama
English television actresses